The Miss South Dakota's Outstanding Teen competition is the pageant that selects the representative for the U.S. state of South Dakota in the Miss America's Outstanding Teen pageant. The pageant is held in Hot Springs, South Dakota.

Olivia Odenbrett of Brandon was crowned Miss South Dakota's Outstanding Teen on June 3, 2022 at the South Dakota State University campus in Brookings, South Dakota. She competed in the Miss America's Outstanding Teen 2023 pageant at the Hyatt Regency Dallas in Dallas, Texas on August 12, 2022.

Results summary
The results of Miss South Dakota's Outstanding Teen as they participated in the national Miss America's Outstanding Teen competition. The year in parentheses indicates the year of the Miss America's Outstanding Teen competition the award/placement was garnered.

Winners

References

External links
 Official website

South Dakota
South Dakota culture
Women in South Dakota
Annual events in South Dakota